The first season of Falsa identidad American television series was produced by Telemundo Global Studios and directed by Conrado Martínez, Diego Muñoz, and Jorge Ríos, the series was first announced in May 2018 by Telemundo's upfront for the 2018–2019 television season. The series was first broadcast in United States on Telemundo from 11 September 2018 to 21 January 2019 with a total of 91 episodes. The video streaming service Netflix acquired  the series for the distribution on worldwide.

Cast

Main 
 Luis Ernesto Franco as Diego Hidalgo / Emiliano Guevara
 Camila Sodi as Isabel / Camila Guevara
 Sergio Goyri as Gavino Gaona
 Samadhi Zendejas as Circe Gaona
 Eduardo Yáñez as Don Mateo
 Sonya Smith as Fernanda Orozco
 Alejandro Camacho as Augusto Orozco

Also main 

 Azela Robinson as Ramona Flores
 Uriel del Toro as Joselito
 Álvaro Guerrero as Ignacio Salas
 Geraldine Bazán as Marlene
 Gabriela Roel as Felipa
 Marcus Ornellas as Porfirio Corona
 Gimena Gómez as Nuria
 Pepe Gámez as Deivid
 Vanesa Restrepo as Paloma
 Claudia Zepeda as Diana Gutiérrez
 Toño Valdes as Chucho
 Carla Giraldo as Silvia
 Juliette Pardau as Gabriela
 Martijn Kuiper as Jim
 Rebeca Manríquez as Zoraida
 Pedro Hernández as Piochas
 Alejandra Zaid as Lourdes
 Hugo Catalán as Eric
 Fernando Memije as Ramiro
 Carlos Tavera as El Topo
 Eduardo Garzón as El Pelos
 Carlos Ramírez Ruelas
 Mauricio de Montellano as Brandon
 Manuel Balbi as Eliseo Hidalgo
 Barbie Casillas as Amanda
 Checo Perezcuadra as Ricardo / Max Guevara

Episodes

References 

2018 American television seasons
2018 Mexican television seasons
2019 American television seasons
2019 Mexican television seasons